Uvijek blizu is the seventh studio album of Montenegrin singer Šako Polumenta, which was released in June 2004.

Track listing

 Punomoć
 Kriza
 Ovjera
 Otkud ti pravo
 Ko si ti
 Ispovijest
 Medena
 Nisi, nisi ti
 Do ludila
 Igraj
 Bila si

2004 albums
Šako Polumenta albums